India maintains 10 paramilitary forces.

List of Paramilitary forces 
From 1986 to 2011 the Central Armed Police Forces were considered as Central Police Forces (CPF). However, as per their respective acts they all are Armed Police Forces.

Ranks and insignia 
Officers

Enlisted ranks

See also 
 Indian Armed Forces
 Central Armed Police Forces
 State Armed Police Forces
 Special forces of India

Notes

References

Further reading 
 India's Paramilitary Forces @ Bharat-Rakshak.Com

External links 
 Assam Rifles official site
 Analysis of the PMF
 An informative article on the PMF
 Global Security article on Border Security Force

 
Ministry of Defence (India)